"That Boy That Girl" is the first single by British band Hadouken!. The first track later re-appeared as the second track on their 2008 debut studio album Music for an Accelerated Culture. The version from the album charted at #188 in the UK Singles Chart dated 10 May 2008.

Background

The band are described on the HMV website as:

Track listing
7"
A: "That Boy That Girl" - 3:39
B:  "Tuning In" - 3:33

10"
A1: "That Boy That Girl" - 3:39
A2: "Tuning In" - 3:33
B1: "Tuning In (H! Re-Rub)" - 5:00

The B-side to the 10" release is mistakenly labelled as "Tuning It (H! Re-Rub)".

Release
The single was originally released as 500 7" records, each one hand coloured and signed by a band member. After these sold out, an additional 500 were printed and sold, but these were left blank. The record was then released as a 10" on Kitsuné Music.

References

2007 debut singles
Hadouken! songs
2007 songs
Kitsuné singles